José Jaime González Pico (born July 28, 1968 in Sogamoso, Boyacá), also known as Chepe González, is a Colombian former road bicycle racer. He won stages in Tour de France and Giro d'Italia. He also won the Vuelta a Colombia in 1994 and 1995.

Major results

1990
 1st Stage 5 Vuelta a Colombia
1991 
 2nd Overall Clásico RCN
1st Stages 3 & 7
1992
 6th Subida a Urkiola
 8th Overall Vuelta a Colombia
1st Stage 5
 8th Overall Tour du Limousin
1993
 5th Overall Vuelta a Colombia
1994
 1st  Overall Vuelta a Colombia
1st  Points classification
1st  Mountains classification
1st  Combination classification 
1st Stages 5, 6 & 8 (ITT)
1995
 1st  Overall Vuelta a Colombia
1st Stages 2 & 11
 1st Stage 5 Clásico RCN
1996
 1st Stage 11 Tour de France
 5th Overall Vuelta a Colombia
1997
 Giro d'Italia
1st  Mountains classification
1st Stage 20
1999
 Giro d'Italia
1st  Mountains classification
1st Stage 5
 1st Stage 7 Vuelta a Colombia
 6th Overall Vuelta a La Rioja
 8th Overall Vuelta a Aragón

External links

Official Tour de France results for Chepe González

1968 births
Living people
People from Sogamoso
Colombian male cyclists
Colombian Tour de France stage winners
Colombian Giro d'Italia stage winners
Vuelta a Colombia stage winners
Sportspeople from Boyacá Department
20th-century Colombian people